Kondracki is a surname. Notable people with the surname include:

 Henry Kondracki (born 1953), Scottish artist
 Larysa Kondracki, Canadian filmmaker
 Michał Kondracki (1902–1984), Polish composer

See also
 

Polish-language surnames
Ukrainian-language surnames